Sherman Township is a township in Montgomery County, Iowa, USA.

History
Sherman Township was created in 1868.

References

Townships in Montgomery County, Iowa
Townships in Iowa